Young Girl may refer to:

 Young Girl (album), by Gary Puckett & The Union Gap, 1968
 "Young Girl" (song), the title song
 The Young Girl, a 1975 Malian film
 "Young Girls", a 2013 song by Bruno Mars

See also
 
 
 Girl